Jonnawada is a village in Buchireddypalem mandal, located in Nellore district of the Indian state of Andhra Pradesh. It is located on the banks of river Pennar.

History
It is famous for Sri Mallikarjuna swamy and Kamakshi amma temple constructed in the year 1150. The goddess Kamakshi is believed as an incarnation of Shakti. A 'Sri Chakram' was installed

References 

Hindu pilgrimage sites in India
Villages in Nellore district